JS Hibiki (AOS-5201) is a Hibiki-class ocean surveillance ship of Japan Maritime Self-Defense Force.

Development and design 
Each vessel has a crew of 40, including five American civilian technicians, and a flight deck for helicopters to operate off of. They are able to deploy on station for 90 days.

The vessels have an AN/UQQ-2 Surveillance Towed Array Sensor System (SURTASS), which is installed in the United States. Data from the sensors is relayed through the Defense Satellite Communications System, and processed and shared with the United States. The data is fed into the Integrated Undersea Surveillance System.

Propulsion is provided by four Mitsubishi S6U-MPTK diesel electric engines.

Construction and career
Hibiki was laid down on 28 November 1989 at Mitsui Engineering & Shipbuilding, Tamano and launched on 27 July 1990. She's commissioned on 30 January 1991. Currently, her homeport is in Kure.

After deployment, from 9 March 1991, the same year, it was circulated to Oakland, California, USA for proficiency training after service, and after learning the SURTASS system, it was equipped with a sonar array in Pearl Harbor, Hawaii, and after the equipment certification test was completed, she returned to Japan on 17 October, the same year.

Full-scale operation started in April 1992, and the actual operation was where the anti-submarine information analysis center on land began.

On 1 December 2015, the Oceanographic Command Group was reorganized into the Oceanographic Command and Anti-submarine Support Group, and was incorporated into the 1st Acoustic Measurement Corps, which was newly formed under the same group.

On 1 November 2017, the crew system was introduced to the 1st Acoustic Measurement Corps for the first time as a JMSDF ship, and from now on, the crew will not be fixed, and 3 crews will operate two ships alternately.

References

1990 ships
Ships built by Mitsui Engineering and Shipbuilding
Hibiki-class ocean surveillance ships